The Canadian Mathematical Society (CMS) is an association of professional mathematicians dedicated to the interests of mathematical research, outreach, scholarship and education in Canada. It serves the national community through the publication of academic journals, community bulletins, and the administration of mathematical competitions.

It was originally conceived in June 1945 as the Canadian Mathematical Congress. A name change was debated for many years; ultimately, a new name was adopted in 1979, upon its incorporation as a non-profit charitable organization.

The society is also affiliated with various national and international mathematical societies, including the Canadian Applied and Industrial Mathematics Society and the Society for Industrial and Applied Mathematics. The society is also a member of the International Mathematical Union and the International Council for Industrial and Applied Mathematics.

History
The Canadian Mathematical Society (CMS) was originally conceived in June 1945 as the Canadian Mathematical Congress. The founding members hoped that "this congress [would] be the beginning of important mathematical development in Canada". Seeking to end confusion with the quadrennial mathematical congresses, a name change was considered for many years. Finally, upon its incorporation as a non-profit, charitable organization in 1978, a new name was adopted – the Canadian Mathematical Society.

Since then the society has expanded its activities to serve K-12 and post secondary students as well as professors and established researchers. Graham P. Wright served as executive director of the CMS from 1979 to 2009, and helped to build up the society's executive office in Ottawa and to develop its web-based electronic services.

The Canadian Mathematical Society was to celebrate its 75th anniversary during its 2020 Summer Meeting in Ottawa, Ontario. However, due to COVID-19 pandemic, the meeting was postponed to 2021 Summer Meeting.

Publications
The flagship publications of the CMS are the prominent, peer-reviewed research journals Canadian Journal of Mathematics, which is intended for full research papers, and the Canadian Mathematical Bulletin, which publishes shorter papers.  All past issues except the last five volumes are free to download. Access to the most recent research requires a subscription.

In cooperation with Springer Publications, the CMS publishes many text books aimed at a university and academic researcher level. The series is called CMS Books in Mathematics.

The CMS publishes ten issues per year of Crux Mathematicorum, which contains problem-solving challenges and techniques suitable for training in secondary school problem solving competitions such as the Canadian Mathematical Olympiad or the International Mathematical Olympiad. All past issues except the last five volumes are free to download and use. The CMS also publishes A Taste of Mathematics (ATOM), a series of small booklets on a variety of topics suitable for high school enrichment.

The CMS Notes is the Society's official newsletter, published six times per year and available to members or the public online. It includes news relevant to the Canadian mathematical community, including notice on conferences, columns on research and education, book reviews, award announcements, and employment advertisements for mathematicians.

Activities

Student Committee
The Canadian Mathematical Society's Student Committee (Studc) was formed in 1999. Studc aims to bring together French and English Canadian graduate and undergraduate mathematics students through research and networking events and publication opportunities. Studc manages and publishes Notes from the Margin, a magazine-style publication devoted to publishing accessible research-based content in addition to opinion pieces, news articles, open problems that are of interest to the mathematical community, and brainteaser puzzles.

Conferences

CMS Meetings
CMS organizes two bilingual Meetings each year: the CMS Winter Meeting is normally held during the first weekend of December and the CMS Summer Meeting during the first weekend of June. Each Meeting takes place over the course of 3 days, with 2 days of pre-meeting activities. This includes the executive meeting, board of directors meeting, group development luncheon and mini-courses.

CMS Meetings are among the biggest mathematical events in Canada, bringing together over 800 of the most respected researchers, educators, post-doctorates and students in mathematics and related fields from around the world. The includes many scientific sessions and plenary, prize and public lectures.

Canadian Undergraduate Mathematics Conference
Through its Student Committee, the CMS is the main sponsor for the bilingual Canadian Undergraduate Mathematics Conference, an annual research and networking conference held each summer and targeted at Canadian undergraduates interested in any area of pure or applied mathematics. It is entirely student-run and driven by Studc. Delegates may opt to present a poster or paper, as well as a short talk on a topic of their choosing. The location of the conference is alternated between central Canada (defined as Ontario and Quebec) and Western or Eastern Canada every other year, with host applications being submitted by hopefuls a year in advance.

CWiMAC
The Women in Mathematics committee of the CMS also runs Connecting Women in Mathematics Across Canada (CWiMAC), a workshop and conference aimed at upcoming Canadian female mathematicians. In particular, they target current PhD students and new postdoctoral fellows seeking guidance in their field. The conference strives to strengthen the community between young female mathematicians and their senior counterparts through the building of mentorship, relationships, and networking.

Competitions

Canadian Open Mathematics Challenge
The CMS administers the Canadian Open Mathematics Challenge, a problem solving competition targeted at Canadian high school students, which is modelled after the analogous William Lowell Putnam Mathematical Competition for undergraduates. High-scoring students may be invited to compete in the Canadian Mathematical Olympiad, a problem-solving and mathematics competition run by the CMS which is also used as a screening process for the selection of the Canadian team for the International Mathematical Olympiad.

Canadian Mathematical Gray Jay Competition

Canadian Mathematical Olympiad

Canadian Junior Mathematical Olympiad

Outreach
CMS runs several annual summer math camps across Canada to foster interest and excitement in elementary-school and secondary-school aged students. Some CMS math camps, are based on invitation and are targeted at high-potential students from all backgrounds, and others are open to all students with interest in mathematics. The CMS also runs several smaller specialty camps targeted at visible minorities and under-represented groups in the mathematical community.

Many member organizations also run outreach events to attract local talent to mathematics, such as Math Challenge programs held at the local university, Math Enrichment Centres, and educational events throughout the academic year.

Awards
The CMS annually awards the following prizes:
Jeffery–Williams Prize to recognize mathematicians who have made outstanding contributions to mathematical research. 
Adrien Pouliot Award for contributions to mathematical education in Canada.
David Borwein Distinguished Career Award to recognize individuals who have made exceptional, broad, and continued contributions to Canadian mathematics.
Graham Wright Award for Distinguished Service recognizes individuals who have made sustained and significant contributions to the Canadian mathematical community and, in particular, to the Canadian Mathematical Society.
Excellence in Teaching Award recognizes sustained and distinguished contributions in teaching at the post-secondary undergraduate level.
G. de B. Robinson Award to recognize the publication of excellent papers in Canadian Journal of Mathematics and the Canadian Mathematical Bulletin
CMS Blair Spearman Doctoral Prize to recognize outstanding performance by a doctoral student.
Krieger–Nelson Prize is presented in recognition of an outstanding female in mathematics.
Coxeter–James Prize to recognize young mathematicians who have made outstanding contributions to mathematical research.
Cathleen Synge Morawetz Prize to recognize an outstanding research publication or series of closely related publications.

Presidents

 Samuel Beatty (1945–1949)
 Adrien Pouliot (1949–1953)
 Gilbert de Beauregard Robinson (1953–1957)
 Ralph Lent Jeffery (1957–1961)
 Ralph James (1961–1963)
 Max Wyman (1963–1965)
 H. S. M. Coxeter (1965–1967)
 Maurice L'Abbé (1967–1969)
 Nathan Mendelsohn (1969–1971)
 George F. D. Duff (1971–1973)
 Albert John Coleman (1973–1975)
 William O. J. Moser (1975–1977)
 Rémi Vaillancourt (1977–1979)
 Peter Lancaster (1979–1981)
 Paul G. Rooney (1981–1983)
 Renzo Piccinini (1983–1985)
 David Borwein (1985–1987)
 Carl Herz (1987–1989)
 Frederick V. Atkinson (1989–1991)
 Sherman D. Riemenschneider (1991–1992)
 Michel Delfour (1992–1994)
 Peter Fillmore (1994–1996)
 Katherine Heinrich (1996–1998)
 Richard Kane (1998–2000)
 Jonathan Borwein (2000–2002)
 Christiane Rousseau (2002–2004)
 H. E. A. Campbell (2004–2006)
 Tom Salisbury (2006–2008)
 Anthony Lau (2008–2010)
 Jacques Hurtubise (2010–2012)
 Keith Taylor (2012–2014)
 Lia Bronsard (2014–2016)
 Michael Bennett (2016–2018)
 Mark Lewis (2018–2020)
 Javad Mashreghi (2020–2022)
 David Pike (2022-present)

See also

Atlantic Association for Research in the Mathematical Sciences
Pacific Institute for the Mathematical Sciences
Fields Institute
Centre de recherches mathématiques
London Mathematical Society
Australian Mathematical Society
American Mathematical Society
Mathematical Association of America
List of mathematical societies

References

External links
Official website of the Canadian Mathematical Society
Official website of the Canadian Undergraduate Mathematics Conference

 
1945 establishments in Canada